Huergo is a surname. Notable people with the surname include:

Fernando Huergo (1908–?), Argentine fencer
Luis Huergo (1837–1913), Argentine engineer 
Yolanda Huergo (1971–2020), Spanish politician